The Oerlikon-Bührle  SNORA and SURA-D are 81-mm and 80-mm rockets developed in Switzerland in the late 1970s and fielded in the 1980s. The SNORA could be used in both air-to-surface and surface-to-surface rocket artillery roles, while the SURA-D is an air-to-surface rocket. The SNORA was developed as a cooperative endeavor with the Italian firm SNIA-Viscosa (later SNIA-BPD).

History
The original version of the SURA rocket, the SURA 80R, was developed by Hispano-Suiza in the 1960s. In 1971 Oerlikon-Buhrle took over the military division of Hispano-Suiza and redesignated the SURA 80R, the SURA-FL, and further developed the SURA-FL which is the current SURA-D. The SNORA rockets can be fired from either a supersonic or subsonic aircraft. The SURA-D though, is limited to subsonic aircraft.

Oerlikon also developed the RWK 014, a surface-to-surface launcher for the type SNORA rockets. The RWK 014 has dual launchers of 15 tubes each and has been mounted on the MOWAG Tornado APC as well as the M113 armored personnel carrier. The RWK 014 can fire 10 rounds per second and has a reload time of six minutes.

The SNORA rocket was still in service as late as 1998 and the SURA-D is still in operational use.  SNORA rockets are launched from a variety of pods housing from either six or twelve rockets, while SURA-D rockets are mounted as a vertical array with only the top-most rocket attached to an aircraft hardpoint. In this system, rockets are fired individually from the bottom of the tier to the top. The unique sliding fixed fin arrangement of the SURA-D acts as the forward hanger for the rocket below it. As the rocket is fired, the four fixed fins mounted on a ring slide down the body till they are stopped at the expansion area of the rocket motor nozzle and are locked in place. The SURA-D increased its accuracy by the addition of flutes inside the nozzle rear to give a low rotation rate in addition to the stabilization effected by four fixed fins which take effect shortly after launch.

Overview
The 80-mm hollow-charge warhead on the SURA-D has been demonstrated by Oerlikon to penetrate  of armor. The SNORA rocket can mount one of two hollow-charge warheads, either the RAK 026 which can penetrate  of armor, or the RAK 054, capable of penetrating  of armor.

Both rockets were exported by Switzerland and adopted by other nations, among them Spain, Qatar, Philippines and Botswana. Italy later used the motor of the SNORA rocket as the basis for the development of the 81-mm Medusa rocket.

Variants

Designation
HE FRAG: High Explosive Fragmentation
HE-I: High Explosive - Incendiary
HC: Hollow Charge (HEAT)
MKR: Marker
TNG: Practice

References
Swiss Military Museum Full
Notes

Citations

Air-to-ground rockets
Artillery of Switzerland
Oerlikon-Contraves
Rocket artillery
Military equipment introduced in the 1980s